Valverde (Spanish meaning "green valley") is a municipality in the Canary Islands in the province of Santa Cruz de Tenerife. It is located on the north-east part of El Hierro (the rest of the island being the municipalities of Frontera and El Pinar). The town of the same name serves as the island's official capital. It is both the smallest Canarian capital and the only one not located by the sea. The town's airport and seaport are both several kilometres away on the island's east coast.

Pastureland and smallholdings dominate the central plateau area with pine and cloud forest at progressively higher elevations. The coastal areas and lower slopes are arid and mainly left to unimproved scrub and sparse grassland. Volcanism is prominent, with several cinder cones and areas of lava flow to be seen.

Historical population

Climate
The city has a tropical desert climate (Köppen climate classification BWh) with mild temperatures year round. Temperatures rarely go below  with the record low being  on January 16, 1981. Frosts are non-existent. Most of the precipitation falls during the winter months. Summers are warm with the warmest month, September averaging , indicating a seasonal lag. Owing to its proximity to the sea, extreme temperatures are rare with the highest temperature recorded being  on October 16, 1983.

Valverde is at an altitude of 571 metres above sea level, while El Hierro airport is just 32 metres above sea level. The difference in altitude can have a significant effect on the weather.

See also 
 List of municipalities in Santa Cruz de Tenerife

References

External links 

Municipalities in El Hierro